Ernesto Sánchez (born 7 November 1947) is a Venezuelan boxer. He competed at the 1972 Summer Olympics and the 1976 Summer Olympics.

References

External links
 

1947 births
Living people
Venezuelan male boxers
Olympic boxers of Venezuela
Boxers at the 1972 Summer Olympics
Boxers at the 1976 Summer Olympics
Place of birth missing (living people)
Light-heavyweight boxers